is a junction passenger railway station in the city of Abiko, Chiba Prefecture Japan, operated by East Japan Railway Company (JR East).

Lines
Abiko is served by both the Jōban Line and the Narita Line. It is 31.3 km from the terminus of the Jōban Line at Ueno Station in Tokyo, and forms the terminus for the Abiko Branch Line of the Narita Line.

Layout
The station is an elevated station with three island platforms and one side platform serving seven tracks. The station has a "Midori no Madoguchi" staffed ticket office.

Platforms

History

Abiko Station opened on December 25, 1896. With the privatization of Japanese National Railways (JNR) on 1 April 1987, the station came under the control of JR East.

Passenger statistics
In fiscal 2019, the station was used by an average of 31,590 passengers daily.

Surrounding area
 
 Abiko City Hall

See also
 List of railway stations in Japan

References

External links

JR East station map
JR East station information 

Railway stations in Japan opened in 1896
Railway stations in Chiba Prefecture
Narita Line
Jōban Line
Abiko, Chiba